The Divisional Commissioner is the chief bureaucratic and revenue officer of a division in Bangladesh. The "Commissioner" supervises the revenue, development and administration work of all the districts and Deputy Commissioner under the jurisdiction of his division.

The Divisional Commissioner office acts as the supervisory head of all divisional government offices situated in the division and oversee the work of Deputy Commissioners who oversee a respective district. A divisional commissioner is given the responsibility of supervising the revenue and development administration of a division. Divisional Commissioners are appointed to their post by the Ministry of Public Administration of the Government of Bangladesh.

The work of the Divisional Commissioner is assisted by the Additional Divisional Commissioner. At any time, there may be more than one Additional Divisional Commissioner working for one Divisional Commissioner.

History
The post of Divisional Commissioner was created in 1829 during the time of British rule in India. Due to a lack of effective control in the departmental revenue administration of a division, and lack of proper control and coordination of the work between the divisional judiciary and the revenue system, the Board of Revenue for divisions were abolished, in favor of the post of Divisional Commissioner.

In its present form, the Office of the Divisional Commissioner exists as a post in the Ministry of Public Administration of Bangladesh.

Recruitment
Normally, officers in the rank of Additional Secretary with previous experience in field administration are usually appointed by the government as Divisional Commissioners.

List of incumbent Divisional Commissioners

The following is a list of incumbent Divisional Commissioners of Bangladesh.

See also
 Divisions of Bangladesh
 Deputy Commissioner
 Ministry of Public Administration

References

Politics of Bangladesh
Government of Bangladesh